Sentara Albemarle Medical Center is a hospital in Elizabeth City, North Carolina. The hospital opened in 1914 and moved to its present location in 1960.  

Sentara Albemarle Medical Center is a 182 licensed bed, full service facility inpatient and critical care,  surgical services, diagnostic imaging technology, comprehensive women's care, cardiology, cancer treatment, and rehabilitation services.  It has eight Shared Inpatient/Ambulatory Surgery, three Endoscopy, and two C-Section operating rooms.

Sentara Albemarle Medical Center has a medical staff of more than 100 physicians, representing nearly 30 specialties, and almost 1,000 employees.

References 

http://www.sentara.com/albemarle-north-carolina/hospitalslocations/locations/new-sentara-albemarle-medical-center.aspx

External links 
 Sentara Albemarle Medical Center official site

Hospital buildings completed in 1960
Hospitals in North Carolina
Buildings and structures in Pasquotank County, North Carolina
Sentara Healthcare System